This is a list of the mammal species recorded in Equatorial Guinea. Of the mammal species in Equatorial Guinea, one is critically endangered, eight are endangered, nine are vulnerable, and four are near threatened.

The following tags are used to highlight each species' conservation status as assessed by the International Union for Conservation of Nature:

Some species were assessed using an earlier set of criteria. Species assessed using this system have the following instead of near threatened and least concern categories:

Order: Hyracoidea (hyraxes) 

The hyraxes are any of four species of fairly small, thickset, herbivorous mammals in the order Hyracoidea. About the size of a domestic cat they are well-furred, with rounded bodies and a stumpy tail. They are native to Africa and the Middle East.

Family: Procaviidae (hyraxes)
Genus: Dendrohyrax
 Western tree hyrax, Dendrohyrax dorsalis LC

Order: Proboscidea (elephants) 

The elephants comprise three living species and are the largest living land animals.

Family: Elephantidae (elephants)
Genus: Loxodonta
African forest elephant, L. cyclotis

Order: Sirenia (manatees and dugongs) 

Sirenia is an order of fully aquatic, herbivorous mammals that inhabit rivers, estuaries, coastal marine waters, swamps, and marine wetlands. All four species are endangered.

Family: Trichechidae
Genus: Trichechus
 African manatee, Trichechus senegalensis VU

Order: Primates 

The order Primates contains humans and their closest relatives: lemurs, lorisoids, tarsiers, monkeys, and apes.

Suborder: Strepsirrhini
Infraorder: Lemuriformes
Superfamily: Lorisoidea
Family: Lorisidae
Genus: Arctocebus
 Golden angwantibo, Arctocebus aureus LR/nt
Genus: Perodicticus
 Potto, Perodicticus potto LR/lc
Family: Galagidae
Genus: Sciurocheirus
 Bioko Allen's bushbaby, Sciurocheirus alleni LR/nt
Genus: Galagoides
 Thomas's bushbaby, Galagoides thomasi LR/lc
 Prince Demidoff's bushbaby, Galagoides demidovii LR/lc
Genus: Euoticus
 Southern needle-clawed bushbaby, Euoticus elegantulus LR/nt
 Northern needle-clawed bushbaby, Euoticus pallidus LR/nt
Suborder: Haplorhini
Infraorder: Simiiformes
Parvorder: Catarrhini
Superfamily: Cercopithecoidea
Family: Cercopithecidae (Old World monkeys)
Genus: Miopithecus
 Gabon talapoin, Miopithecus ogouensis LR/lc
Genus: Cercopithecus
 Moustached guenon, Cercopithecus cephus LR/lc
 Red-eared guenon, Cercopithecus erythrotis VU
 De Brazza's monkey, Cercopithecus neglectus LR/lc
 Greater spot-nosed monkey, Cercopithecus nictitans LR/lc
 Crowned guenon, Cercopithecus pogonias LR/lc
 Preuss's monkey, Cercopithecus preussi EN
Genus: Lophocebus
 Grey-cheeked mangabey, Lophocebus albigena LR/lc
Genus: Cercocebus
 Collared mangabey, Cercocebus torquatus LR/nt
Genus: Mandrillus
 Drill, Mandrillus leucophaeus EN
 Mandrill, Mandrillus sphinx VU
Subfamily: Colobinae
Genus: Colobus
 Mantled guereza, Colobus guereza LR/lc
 Black colobus, Colobus satanas VU
Genus: Procolobus
 Red colobus, Procolobus badius EN
 Pennant's colobus, Procolobus pennantii EN
Superfamily: Hominoidea
Family: Hominidae (great apes)
Subfamily: Homininae
Tribe: Gorillini
Genus: Gorilla
 Western gorilla, Gorilla gorilla EN
Tribe: Panini
Genus: Pan
 Common chimpanzee, Pan troglodytes EN

Order: Rodentia (rodents) 

Rodents make up the largest order of mammals, with over 40% of mammalian species. They have two incisors in the upper and lower jaw which grow continually and must be kept short by gnawing.

Suborder: Hystricognathi
Family: Hystricidae (Old World porcupines)
Genus: Atherurus
 African brush-tailed porcupine, Atherurus africanus LC
Family: Thryonomyidae (cane rats)
Genus: Thryonomys
 Greater cane rat, Thryonomys swinderianus LC
Suborder: Sciurognathi
Family: Anomaluridae
Subfamily: Anomalurinae
Genus: Anomalurus
 Lord Derby's scaly-tailed squirrel, Anomalurus derbianus LC
 Dwarf scaly-tailed squirrel, Anomalurus pusillus LC
Genus: Anomalurops
 Beecroft's scaly-tailed squirrel, Anomalurops beecrofti LC
Subfamily: Zenkerellinae
Genus: Idiurus
 Long-eared flying mouse, Idiurus macrotis LC
 Flying mouse, Idiurus zenkeri DD
Family: Sciuridae (squirrels)
Subfamily: Xerinae
Tribe: Protoxerini
Genus: Epixerus
 Baifran palm squirrel, Epixerus wilsoni DD
Genus: Funisciurus
 Thomas's rope squirrel, Funisciurus anerythrus DD
 Lady Burton's rope squirrel, Funisciurus isabella LC
 Ribboned rope squirrel, Funisciurus lemniscatus DD
 Red-cheeked rope squirrel, Funisciurus leucogenys DD
 Fire-footed rope squirrel, Funisciurus pyrropus LC
Genus: Heliosciurus
 Red-legged sun squirrel, Heliosciurus rufobrachium LC
Genus: Myosciurus
 African pygmy squirrel, Myosciurus pumilio DD
Genus: Paraxerus
 Green bush squirrel, Paraxerus poensis LC
Genus: Protoxerus
 Forest giant squirrel, Protoxerus stangeri LC
Family: Gliridae (dormice)
Subfamily: Graphiurinae
Genus: Graphiurus
 Jentink's dormouse, Graphiurus crassicaudatus DD
 Silent dormouse, Graphiurus surdus DD
Family: Nesomyidae
Subfamily: Cricetomyinae
Genus: Cricetomys
 Emin's pouched rat, Cricetomys emini LC
Family: Muridae (mice, rats, voles, gerbils, hamsters, etc.)
Subfamily: Deomyinae
Genus: Deomys
 Link rat, Deomys ferrugineus LC
Genus: Lophuromys
 Fire-bellied brush-furred rat, Lophuromys nudicaudus LC
 Rusty-bellied brush-furred rat, Lophuromys sikapusi LC
Subfamily: Murinae
Genus: Colomys
 African wading rat, Colomys goslingi LC
Genus: Grammomys
 Shining thicket rat, Grammomys rutilans LC
Genus: Heimyscus
 African smoky mouse, Heimyscus fumosus LC
Genus: Hybomys
 Father Basilio's striped mouse, Hybomys basilii EN
 Peters's striped mouse, Hybomys univittatus LC
Genus: Hylomyscus
 Beaded wood mouse, Hylomyscus aeta LC
 Allen's wood mouse, Hylomyscus alleni LC
 Little wood mouse, Hylomyscus parvus LC
 Stella wood mouse, Hylomyscus stella LC
Genus: Malacomys
 Big-eared swamp rat, Malacomys longipes LC
Genus: Mastomys
 Natal multimammate mouse, Mastomys natalensis LC
Genus: Mus
 African pygmy mouse, Mus minutoides LC
 Peters's mouse, Mus setulosus LC
Genus: Oenomys
 Common rufous-nosed rat, Oenomys hypoxanthus LC
Genus: Praomys
 Jackson's soft-furred mouse, Praomys jacksoni LC
 Cameroon soft-furred mouse, Praomys morio VU
 Tullberg's soft-furred mouse, Praomys tullbergi LC
Genus: Stochomys
 Target rat, Stochomys longicaudatus LC

Order: Soricomorpha (shrews, moles, and solenodons) 

The "shrew-forms" are insectivorous mammals. The shrews and solenodons closely resemble mice while the moles are stout-bodied burrowers.

Family: Soricidae (shrews)
Subfamily: Crocidurinae
Genus: Crocidura
 Bates's shrew, Crocidura batesi LC
 Long-footed shrew, Crocidura crenata LC
 Dent's shrew, Crocidura denti LC
 Goliath shrew, Crocidura goliath LC
 Fraser's musk shrew, Crocidura poensis LC
 Turbo shrew, Crocidura turba LC
Genus: Paracrocidura
 Lesser large-headed shrew, Paracrocidura schoutedeni LC
Genus: Sylvisorex
 Bioko forest shrew, Sylvisorex isabellae EN
 Johnston's forest shrew, Sylvisorex johnstoni LC
 Greater forest shrew, Sylvisorex ollula LC
Subfamily: Myosoricinae
Genus: Myosorex
 Eisentraut's mouse shrew, Myosorex eisentrauti CR

Order: Chiroptera (bats) 

The bats' most distinguishing feature is that their forelimbs are developed as wings, making them the only mammals capable of flight. Bat species account for about 20% of all mammals.

Family: Pteropodidae (flying foxes, Old World fruit bats)
Subfamily: Pteropodinae
Genus: Eidolon
 Straw-coloured fruit bat, Eidolon helvum LC
Genus: Epomophorus
 Wahlberg's epauletted fruit bat, Epomophorus wahlbergi LC
Genus: Epomops
 Franquet's epauletted fruit bat, Epomops franqueti LC
Genus: Hypsignathus
 Hammer-headed bat, Hypsignathus monstrosus LC
Genus: Micropteropus
 Peters's dwarf epauletted fruit bat, Micropteropus pusillus LC
Genus: Myonycteris
 Little collared fruit bat, Myonycteris torquata LC
Genus: Rousettus
 Egyptian fruit bat, Rousettus aegyptiacus LC
Genus: Scotonycteris
 Zenker's fruit bat, Scotonycteris zenkeri NT
Subfamily: Macroglossinae
Genus: Megaloglossus
 Woermann's bat, Megaloglossus woermanni LC
Family: Vespertilionidae
Subfamily: Myotinae
Genus: Myotis
 Rufous mouse-eared bat, Myotis bocagii LC
Subfamily: Vespertilioninae
Genus: Eptesicus
 Lagos serotine, Eptesicus platyops DD
Genus: Glauconycteris
 Silvered bat, Glauconycteris argentata LC
 Beatrix's bat, Glauconycteris beatrix NT
 Abo bat, Glauconycteris poensis LC
Genus: Mimetillus
 Moloney's mimic bat, Mimetillus moloneyi LC
Genus: Neoromicia
 Dark-brown serotine, Neoromicia brunneus NT
 Cape serotine, Neoromicia capensis LC
 Banana pipistrelle, Neoromicia nanus LC
 White-winged serotine, Neoromicia tenuipinnis LC
Genus: Pipistrellus
 Tiny pipistrelle, Pipistrellus nanulus LC
Genus: Scotophilus
 Nut-colored yellow bat, Scotophilus nux LC
Subfamily: Miniopterinae
Genus: Miniopterus
 Greater long-fingered bat, Miniopterus inflatus LC
Family: Molossidae
Genus: Chaerephon
 Little free-tailed bat, Chaerephon pumila LC
Genus: Mops
 Sierra Leone free-tailed bat, Mops brachypterus LC
 Spurrell's free-tailed bat, Mops spurrelli LC
 Railer bat, Mops thersites LC
Family: Emballonuridae
Genus: Saccolaimus
 Pel's pouched bat, Saccolaimus peli NT
Genus: Taphozous
 Mauritian tomb bat, Taphozous mauritianus LC
Family: Nycteridae
Genus: Nycteris
 Bate's slit-faced bat, Nycteris arge LC
 Large slit-faced bat, Nycteris grandis LC
 Hairy slit-faced bat, Nycteris hispida LC
 Large-eared slit-faced bat, Nycteris macrotis LC
 Dwarf slit-faced bat, Nycteris nana LC
Family: Rhinolophidae
Subfamily: Rhinolophinae
Genus: Rhinolophus
 Halcyon horseshoe bat, Rhinolophus alcyone LC
 Lander's horseshoe bat, Rhinolophus landeri LC
Subfamily: Hipposiderinae
Genus: Hipposideros
 Benito roundleaf bat, Hipposideros beatus LC
 Sundevall's roundleaf bat, Hipposideros caffer LC
 Short-tailed roundleaf bat, Hipposideros curtus VU
 Cyclops roundleaf bat, Hipposideros cyclops LC
 Giant roundleaf bat, Hipposideros gigas LC
 Noack's roundleaf bat, Hipposideros ruber LC

Order: Pholidota (pangolins) 

The order Pholidota comprises the eight species of pangolin. Pangolins are anteaters and have the powerful claws, elongated snout and long tongue seen in the other unrelated anteater species.

Family: Manidae
Genus: Manis
 Giant pangolin, Manis gigantea LR/lc
 Long-tailed pangolin, Manis tetradactyla LR/lc
 Tree pangolin, Manis tricuspis LR/lc

Order: Cetacea (whales) 

The order Cetacea includes whales, dolphins and porpoises. They are the mammals most fully adapted to aquatic life with a spindle-shaped nearly hairless body, protected by a thick layer of blubber, and forelimbs and tail modified to provide propulsion underwater.

Suborder: Mysticeti
Family: Balaenopteridae
Subfamily: Balaenopterinae
Genus: Balaenoptera
 Common minke whale, Balaenoptera acutorostrata LC
 Antarctic minke whale, Balaenoptera bonaerensis DD
 Sei whale, Balaenoptera borealis EN
 Bryde's whale, Balaenoptera edeni DD
 Blue whale, Balaenoptera musculus EN
 Fin whale, Balaenoptera physalus EN
Subfamily: Megapterinae
Genus: Megaptera
 Humpback whale, Megaptera novaeangliae VU
Suborder: Odontoceti
Superfamily: Platanistoidea
Family: Physeteridae
Genus: Physeter
 Sperm whale, Physeter macrocephalus VU
Family: Kogiidae
Genus: Kogia
 Pygmy sperm whale, Kogia breviceps LR/lc
 Dwarf sperm whale, Kogia sima LR/lc
Family: Ziphidae
Subfamily: Hyperoodontinae
Genus: Mesoplodon
 Blainville's beaked whale, Mesoplodon densirostris DD
 Gervais' beaked whale, Mesoplodon europaeus DD
Genus: Ziphius
 Cuvier's beaked whale, Ziphius cavirostris DD
Family: Delphinidae (marine dolphins)
Genus: Steno
 Rough-toothed dolphin, Steno bredanensis DD
Genus: Tursiops
 Common bottlenose dolphin, Tursiops truncatus LC
Genus: Delphinus
 Long-beaked common dolphin, Delphinus capensis DD
Genus: Stenella
 Pantropical spotted dolphin, Stenella attenuata LR/cd
 Striped dolphin, Stenella coeruleoalba LR/cd
 Atlantic spotted dolphin, Stenella frontalis DD
 Clymene dolphin, Stenella clymene DD
 Spinner dolphin, Stenella longirostris LR/cd
Genus: Lagenodelphis
 Fraser's dolphin, Lagenodelphis hosei DD
Genus: Sousa
 Atlantic humpback dolphin, Sousa teuszii
Genus: Orcinus
 Orca, Orcinus orca LR/cd
Genus: Feresa
 Pygmy killer whale, Feresa attenuata DD
Genus: Pseudorca
 False killer whale, Pseudorca crassidens LR/lc
Genus: Globicephala
 Short-finned pilot whale, Globicephala macrorhynchus LR/cd
Genus: Peponocephala
 Melon-headed whale, Peponocephala electra DD

Order: Carnivora (carnivorans) 

There are over 260 species of carnivorans, the majority of which feed primarily on meat. They have a characteristic skull shape and dentition.
Suborder: Feliformia
Family: Felidae (cats)
Subfamily: Felinae
Genus: Caracal
African golden cat, C. aurata 
Subfamily: Pantherinae
Genus: Panthera
 Leopard, Panthera pardus LC
Family: Viverridae (civets, mongooses, etc.)
Subfamily: Viverrinae
Genus: Civettictis
 African civet, Civettictis civetta LR/lc
Genus: Genetta
 Rusty-spotted genet, Genetta maculata LR/lc
 Servaline genet, Genetta servalina LR/lc
Genus: Poiana
 Central African oyan, Poiana richardsonii LR/lc
Family: Nandiniidae
Genus: Nandinia
 African palm civet, Nandinia binotata LR/lc
Family: Herpestidae (mongooses)
Genus: Atilax
 Marsh mongoose, Atilax paludinosus LR/lc
Genus: Bdeogale
 Black-footed mongoose, Bdeogale nigripes LR/lc
Genus: Herpestes
 Common slender mongoose, Herpestes sanguineus LR/lc
Genus: Xenogale
 Long-nosed mongoose, Xenogale naso LR/lc
Family: Hyaenidae (hyaenas)
Genus: Crocuta
 Spotted hyena, Crocuta crocuta LR/cd
Suborder: Caniformia
Family: Mustelidae (mustelids)
Genus: Ictonyx
 Striped polecat, Ictonyx striatus LR/lc
Genus: Mellivora
 Honey badger, Mellivora capensis LR/lc
Genus: Hydrictis
 Speckle-throated otter, H. maculicollis LC
Genus: Aonyx
 African small-clawed otter, Aonyx congicus NT

Order: Artiodactyla (even-toed ungulates) 

The even-toed ungulates are ungulates whose weight is borne about equally by the third and fourth toes, rather than mostly or entirely by the third as in perissodactyls. There are about 220 artiodactyl species, including many that are of great economic importance to humans.

Family: Suidae (pigs)
Subfamily: Suinae
Genus: Potamochoerus
 Red river hog, Potamochoerus porcus LR/lc
Family: Hippopotamidae (hippopotamuses)
Genus: Hippopotamus
 Hippopotamus, Hippopotamus amphibius VU
Family: Tragulidae
Genus: Hyemoschus
 Water chevrotain, Hyemoschus aquaticus DD
Family: Bovidae (cattle, antelope, sheep, goats)
Subfamily: Antilopinae
Genus: Neotragus
 Bates's pygmy antelope, Neotragus batesi LR/nt
Subfamily: Bovinae
Genus: Syncerus
 African buffalo, Syncerus caffer LR/cd
Genus: Tragelaphus
 Bongo, Tragelaphus eurycerus LR/nt
 Bushbuck, Tragelaphus scriptus LR/lc
 Sitatunga, Tragelaphus spekii LR/nt
Subfamily: Cephalophinae
Genus: Cephalophus
 Peters's duiker, Cephalophus callipygus LR/nt
 Bay duiker, Cephalophus dorsalis LR/nt
 White-bellied duiker, Cephalophus leucogaster LR/nt
 Blue duiker, Cephalophus monticola LR/lc
 Black-fronted duiker, Cephalophus nigrifrons LR/nt
 Ogilby's duiker, Cephalophus ogilbyi LR/nt
 Yellow-backed duiker, Cephalophus silvicultor LR/nt

See also
List of chordate orders
Lists of mammals by region
List of prehistoric mammals
Mammal classification
List of mammals described in the 2000s

Notes

References
 

Equatorial Guinea
Equatorial Guinea
Mammals